Howard Fenno Patterson (September 18, 1927 – October 28, 2000) was an American competition swimmer who represented the United States at the 1948 Summer Olympics in London.  Patterson competed in the semifinals of the men's 100-meter backstroke, and finished ninth overall with a time of 1:09.9.

See also
 List of Michigan State University people

References

1927 births
2000 deaths
American male backstroke swimmers
Michigan State Spartans men's swimmers
Olympic swimmers of the United States
Sportspeople from Saginaw, Michigan
Swimmers at the 1948 Summer Olympics
20th-century American people
21st-century American people